The municipality of Tres Islas is one of the municipalities of Cerro Largo Department, Uruguay, established on 30 October 2018. Its seat is the town of Tres Islas.

History 
This municipality was created on 30 October 2018 by Departmental Board of Cerro Largo Decree No. 29/2018, covering the same territory of the electoral constituency identified by the Electoral Board of Cerro Largo as series GFA.

Location 
The municipality is located at the west area of Cerro Largo Department. Its seat is the town of Tres Islas.

Authorities 
The authority of the municipality is the Municipal Council, integrated by the Mayor (who presides it) and four Councilors.

References 

Tres Islas
2018 establishments in Uruguay
States and territories established in 2018